1864 was the 78th season of cricket in England (since the foundation of Marylebone Cricket Club (MCC)). It was a significant year in cricket history, as it saw the legalisation of overarm bowling and the first edition of John Wisden’s Cricketers’ Almanac.

Inter-county cricket
The first-class county teams in 1864 were: Cambridgeshire, Hampshire, Kent, Middlesex, Notts, Surrey, Sussex and Yorkshire. The unofficial concept of a "champion county" took a new turn when periodicals began publishing tables of inter-county results, although there was still no formal or agreed method of deciding positions in the table. Haygarth usually refers to 'generally agreed' when announcing the Champion County.

Events
 Law 10 was rewritten by the MCC to allow a bowler to bring his arm through at any height providing he kept it straight and did not throw the ball.  The issue of overarm bowling had crystallised in the Willsher-Lillywhite incident of August 1862.
 12 January – formation of Lancashire County Cricket Club at a meeting in Manchester.
 27–29 January – Otago v. Canterbury at Dunedin was the start of first-class cricket in New Zealand.
 Madras v. Calcutta was the start of first-class cricket in India.
 First issue of Wisden Cricketers' Almanack. It was titled John Wisden’s Cricketers’ Almanac until the 1937 edition.
 6–7 June – Middlesex County Cricket Club played its initial first-class match v. Sussex at Islington
 9 June – Playing for MCC against Oxford University, H.E. Bull becomes only the second player, and the first since 1827, to be dismissed hit the ball twice in a first-class game.
 7–8 July – Hampshire County Cricket Club played its initial first-class match v. Sussex at the Antelope Ground, Southampton
 11–12 July – First appearance of WG Grace in a "big" match, though his first-class debut would not occur until the following season.
 MCC finally purchased the freehold of Lord's Cricket Ground for £18,333 6s 8d with money advanced by William Nicholson.

Leading batsmen (qualification 10 innings)

Leading bowlers (qualification 800 balls)

References

Annual reviews
 Fred Lillywhite, The Guide to Cricketers, Lillywhite, 1865
 John Lillywhite's Cricketer's Companion (Green Lilly), Lillywhite, 1865
 Arthur Haygarth, Scores & Biographies, Volume 8 (1863-1864), Lillywhite, 1865

1864 in English cricket
English cricket seasons in the 19th century